Mentada mandal is one of the 34 mandals in Vizianagaram district of the Indian state of Andhra Pradesh. It is administration under Parvathipuram revenue division and headquartered at Mentada. The mandal is bounded by Pachipenta, Ramabhadrapuram, Dattirajeru and Gajapathinagaram mandals. A portion of it also borders the state of Odisha.

Demographics 

 census, the mandal had a population of 49,153. The total population constitute, 24,378 males and 24,775 females. The entire population is rural in nature.

Government and politics 

Mentada mandal is one of the four mandals in Salur (Assembly constituency), which in turn is a part of Araku (Lok Sabha constituency), one of the 25 Lok Sabha constituencies representing Andhra Pradesh. The present MLA is Rajanna Dora Peedika, who won the Andhra Pradesh Legislative Assembly election, 2014 representing YSR Congress Party.

Rural villages
 2011 census of India, the mandal has 37 settlements, consisting of 37 villages.

The settlements in the mandal are listed below:

References

Mandals in Vizianagaram district